The Philadelphia City Council, the legislative body of Philadelphia, Pennsylvania, consists of ten members elected by district and seven members elected at-large. The council president is elected by the members from among their number. Each member's term is four years, and there are no limits on the number of terms a member may serve.

History 
While William Penn's original 1691 charter for the city of Philadelphia included a "common council," no records exist of this body ever having been convened. Its successor, the Proprietor's Charter of 1701, constituted the city as a municipal corporation with a non-elected council made up of major city officials who selected their own successors. The colonial city government was abolished during the American Revolution and replaced in 1789 with an elected council including fifteen aldermen and thirty common councillors; these then elected a mayor and recorder who also were members of the council. In 1796, a bicameral city council was created including a 20-member Common Council and 12-member Select Council; the sizes of both bodies increased with the population of the city, peaking at 149 members of Common Council and 41 in Select Council, the largest municipal legislature in the US. It was replaced with a single 21-member chamber in 1919, which remained in effect until the adoption of a Home Rule charter in 1951.

Composition and term 

The 1951 Home Rule Charter established the council as the legislative arm of Philadelphia municipal government, consisting of seventeen members. Ten council members are elected by district and seven from the city at large. At-large council members are elected using limited voting with limited nomination in which voters may only select five candidates on the ballot, and which guarantees that two minority-party or independent candidates are elected.  Each is elected for a term of four years with no limit on the number of terms that may be served.

The members of City Council elect from among themselves a president, who serves as the regular chairperson of council meetings.  In consultation with the majority of council members, the President appoints members to the various standing committees of the council.  The president is also responsible for selecting and overseeing most Council employees.

Legislative process 

Every proposed ordinance is in the form of a bill introduced by a Council member. Before a bill can be enacted, it must be referred by the president of the council to an appropriate standing committee, considered at a public hearing and public meeting, reported out by the committee, printed as reported by the committee, distributed to the members of the council, and made available to the public. Passage of a bill requires the favorable vote of a majority of all members. A bill becomes law upon the approval of the mayor. If the mayor vetoes a bill, the council may override the veto by a two-thirds vote.

Under the rules of the council, regular public sessions are held weekly, usually on Thursday morning at 10:00am, in Room 400, City Hall.  Council normally breaks for the summer months of July and August.

Gerrymandering 

In a 2006 computer study of local and state legislative districts, two of the city's ten council districts, the 5th and the 7th, were found to be among the least compact districts in the nation, giving rise to suspicions of gerrymandering. The Committee of Seventy, a non-partisan watchdog group for local elections, asked candidates for council in 2007 to support a list of ethics statements, including a call for fair redistricting, which should take place after the 2010 United States Census. In 2011, the council approved a redistricting map with more compact boundaries, eliminating the gerrymandered borders of the 5th and 7th districts; it took effect for the 2015 elections.

City council members 
:

Presidents of the City Council

See also

 John Scott Medal
List of members of Philadelphia City Council from 1920 to 1952
List of members of Philadelphia City Council since 1952
Political families of Philadelphia

References

Further reading
 Ginsberg, Thomas; City Councils in Philadelphia and Other Major Cities: Who Holds Office, How Long They Serve, and How Much It All Costs; Pew Charitable Trusts’ Philadelphia Research Initiative (2011). (Overview)

External links
Philadelphia City Council website

City Council
Pennsylvania city councils